Bhoot Bhooturey Samuddurey is a 2014 Bengali children's film directed by Swapan Ghoshal. The film is based on a short story by Prafulla Roy.

Plot
The story of the film is narrated by Paran Bandyopadhyay. The plot involves two siblings, Titli and Tabul, who goes to Digha in a family vacation. They find that Lalkamol babu, who occupied the next room, has disappeared without any trace. The two children, getting involved with this mystery, unexpectedly finds a group of ghosts.

Cast
Megha Deb
Sayan Sarkar 
Bhaswar Chatterjee 
Jayjit Banerjee 
Santilal Mukherjee 
Paran Bandopadhyay

Reviews
Sutapa Singha of The Times of India gave the film a 3 out of 5 stars. She asserts that the film "makes an impact because of the convincing performances".

According to Shoma A. Chatterji of The Indian Express, the film has good actors, but its intention is wasted due to "badly-scripted characters".

References

Bengali-language Indian films
2010s Bengali-language films
2014 films